Fallen House, Sunken City is the second studio album by B. Dolan. It was released on Strange Famous Records on March 2, 2010. Entirely produced by Alias, it features guest appearances from P.O.S and Cadence Weapon.

Critical reception

At Metacritic, which assigns a weighted average score out of 100 to reviews from mainstream critics, the album received an average score of 81, based on 4 reviews, indicating "universal acclaim".

Chris Faraone of The Phoenix commented that "There are thousands of MCs who rhyme about high-ranking war criminals and corporate genocide, but few wax progressive notes like Dolan." Eddie Fleisher of Alternative Press praised Alias' production, stating, "his spastic, head-nodding beats are so good, that they occasionally overshadow the headliner." He added, "However, that's not due to any lack of talent on Dolan's part, who's on the top of his game throughout the disc." Alan Ranta of PopMatters wrote, "In a world growing more cynical by the day, Fallen House, Sunken City is a beacon of hope, as empowering and cerebral as it is worthy of bumping and grinding."

Track listing

Personnel
Credits adapted from liner notes.

 B. Dolan – vocals, co-production (7), recording
 Alias – production, arrangement (9), mixing
 Sage Francis – backing vocals (3, 9, 10)
 Justin Bowse – piano (7)
 Shane Hall – guitar (7), backing vocals (9)
 The Ticklebomb Choir – backing vocals (9)
 Larry Mauk – trumpet (9), arrangement (9)
 Neal Bijlani – trumpet (9)
 Cordero Lopez – trumpet (9)
 Andy Deangelis – trombone (9)
 Chris Erway – trombone (9)
 Katie Zmed – saxophone (9)
 Greg Burbank – tuba (9)
 Joe Defrancesco – tuba (9)
 Annelise Grimm – drums (9)
 Mindy Stock – drums (9)
 Paul McCarthy – drums (9)
 P.O.S – vocals (10), lyrics (10)
 Cadence Weapon – vocals (10), lyrics (10)
 Buddy Peace – turntables (11)
 Uncle Pete MacPhee – artwork
 Irena Mihalinec – layout

References

External links
 
 
 Fallen House, Sunken City at Strange Famous Records

2010 albums
Hip hop albums by American artists
Strange Famous Records albums
Albums produced by Alias (musician)